Hunsel is a village in the south-eastern Netherlands.

History 
The village was first mentioned in 1400 as Hunsel. The etymology is unclear. Hunsel developed along the Uffelse beek.

The Catholic St Jacobus de Meerdere is a single aisled church with the tower on the side. The tower dates from around 1300. In 1839, was built next to the tower. Between 1925 and 1926, it was expanded by Joseph Cuypers. In 1944, the tower was blown up. The damage to the church was repaired in 1946, and in 1955, a new tower was built according to the old design.

The watermill Uffelse Molen is a grist mill from around 1800. In 1961, it went out of service. In 2008, it was restored.

Hunsel was home to 236 people in 1840. Until it became a part of Leudal on 1 January 2007, Hunsel was a separate municipality, covering also the villages of Ell, Haler, Ittervoort and Neeritter

Hunsel has its own football club, RKHVC. It has been founded in 1943.

Born in Hunsel
 Antonius Bouwens (1876–1963), Dutch sport shooter who won a bronze medal at the Summer Olympics

Gallery

References

External links
Official website

Municipalities of the Netherlands disestablished in 2007
Populated places in Limburg (Netherlands)
Former municipalities of Limburg (Netherlands)
Leudal